Xenasmatella is a genus of corticioid fungi in the order Polyporales. Circumscribed by German mycologist Franz Oberwinkler in 1966, the widespread genus contains 14 species.

Species
X. ardosiaca (Bourdot & Galzin) Stalpers (1996) – Taiwan; Tennessee
X. bicornis  (Boidin & Gilles) Piatek (2005)
X. borealis  (K.H.Larss. & Hjortstam) Duhem (2010)
X. caricis-pendulae (P.Roberts) Duhem (2010)
X. cinnamomea  (Burds. & Nakasone) Stalpers (1996)
X. globigera  (Hjortstam & Ryvarden) Duhem (2010)
X. insperata  (H.S.Jacks.) Jülich (1979)
X. nasti  (Boidin & Gilles) Stalpers (1996)
X. palmicola  (Hjortstam & Ryvarden) Duhem (2010)
X. romellii  Hjortstam (1983) – Sweden
X. sanguinescens  Svrcek (1973)
X. subflavidogrisea (Litsch.) Oberw. ex Jülich (1979) – Great Britain
X. vaga  (Fr.) Stalpers (1996) – Europe; United States

References

Polyporales
Polyporales genera
Taxa described in 1966